Henry Wodehouse (born 19 March 1799, Kimberley, Norfolk; died 29 April 1834, Montagu Square, London) was an English cricketer with amateur status. He was associated with Marylebone Cricket Club (MCC) and made his first-class debut in 1828. He played for the Gentlemen in the Gentlemen v Players match.

References

Bibliography
 

1799 births
1834 deaths
English cricketers
English cricketers of 1826 to 1863
Marylebone Cricket Club cricketers
Gentlemen cricketers
Non-international England cricketers
Married v Single cricketers
Gentlemen of England cricketers
People from Kimberley, Norfolk
Lord Strathavon's XI cricketers